Narva United FC is a futsal, football, beach soccer, and senior football club based in Narva, Estonia.

The club was founded in 2012 and currently plays football in the II Liiga E/N, futsal in Triobet Saaliliiga (Estonian top league), beach soccer in the Unibet Rannaliiga (Estonian top league).

Narva United futsal team were champions of Estonia in 2016/2017, and were participants of last ever UEFA Futsal Cup Preliminary Round in August 2017*
 Since season 2018 official tournament name UEFA Futsal Champions League

During three matches in Mostar, Bosnia and Herzegovina, Narva United had one win over Flamurtari (champions of Albania). 

Narva United finished three times in second place in Estonian futsal (2012/2013, 2015/2016, 2017/2018), and twice finished third (2019/2020, 2020/2021).

Narva United is the most attended futsal club in Estonia and holds the National Futsal league match attendance record. 
8 seasons of 9 (since 2012) Narva United were most attended futsal team in Estonia*
Season 2020/2021 not included. Because of COVID-19 restrictions, 90% of league matches were played without fans.

Narva United futsal team were honored as the best Ida-Virumaa region sport team in 2017, and best Narva sport team in 2020.

Narva United football team were also the reserve team of Narva Trans (during 2016 and 2017 seasons).

During the 2015 season Narva United football team won Estonian "Väike Karikas" (Small Cup) Trophy, Estonian Football Association official tournament for teams playing in lower divisions (starting from Second League and lower)
Final match were played on A.Le Coq Arena, central football stadium of Estonia.
Narva United - Ajax Tallinn 1-1 (4-3 pen)

Since season 2022/2023 Narva United has three teams in futsal: main team in top division of Estonia, second team (in league 1), and women futsal team

President of Narva United FC: Oleg Kašin
Manager of Narva United FC: Aleksandr Dmitrijev

Narva United coaches with EFA category:
Aleksandr Dmitrijev
Valeri Smelkov
Pavel Ogurtsov
Stanislav Bõstrov
Andrei Rešetnikov
Konstantin Mihhejev

Honours

Futsal Domestic 
Triobet Saaliliiga (Estonian top futsal league / Estonian championship):
 Winner: 2016/2017
 Second place (2): 2012/2013, 2015/2016

Football Domestic

 III Liiga E
 Runners-up (2): 2014, 2015
 Väike Karikas (National Cup for amateur teams):  Winner: 2014

Players

Current squad
 ''As of 25 April 2017.

Statistics

League and Cup

References

External links
 Official website 

Association football clubs established in 2014
Football clubs in Estonia
JK Narva Trans
Futsal in Estonia